Live at the Milky Way is a live album by Captain Sensible, released in 1994 by Humbug Records. It was recorded at the Milky Way club in Amsterdam on the final gig of a European tour supporting the album The Universe of Geoffrey Brown. Sensible's backing band, known as the Ugly Sods, features ex-Damned bassist Paul Gray, keyboardist Malcolm Dixon and drummer Garrie Dreadful.

Critical reception 

In his review for AllMusic, Bruce Eder wrote that Live at the Milky Way includes "hard grinding, deep crunching, yet richly recorded versions of "Jet Boy Jet Girl," "Neat Neat Neat," "Smash It Up," "Love Song," and "New Rose". He called the sound "both raw and lush", noting that "some of the between-song chatter is as good as the music." In the 5th edition of his Encyclopedia of Popular Music, Colin Larkin wrote that the album managed to capture both Sensible's "humour and considerable songwriting talent", adding that "the band performs as if it is their last day on the planet on rewarding versions of "Neat Neat Neat", "New Rose" and "Happy Talk."

Track listing

Personnel
Musicians
Captain Sensible - guitar, vocals
Paul Gray - bass
Malcolm Dixon - organ, synthesizer
Garrie Dreadful - drums
Technical
Captain Barrington-White - "space whispers", synthesizer programming
Riny Van Zoolingen - live recording
Mixed at the Old Pink Dog, Worthing
Mike Roberts - engineer

References 

Captain Sensible albums
1994 live albums